A DVD (digital video disc or digital versatile disc) is a data storage medium.

DVD may also refer to:

Medicine
 Developmental verbal dyspraxia, a condition in children involving problems saying sounds, syllables and words
 Dissociated vertical deviation, an eye condition associated with a squint

Other
 D v D, a Court of Appeal of England and Wales case regarding residence in the UK
  or miscellaneous right, in France, right-wing candidates who are not members of any large party
 Driver vigilance device, a railroad safety device that operates in the case of incapacitation of the engineer

See also
 The DVD (disambiguation)